The American Cancer Society (ACS) is a nationwide voluntary health organization dedicated to eliminating cancer. Established in 1913, the society is organized into six geographical regions of both medical and lay volunteers operating in more than 250 Regional offices throughout the United States. Its global headquarters is located in the American Cancer Society Center in Atlanta, Georgia. The ACS publishes the journals Cancer, CA: A Cancer Journal for Clinicians and Cancer Cytopathology.

History

The society was founded on May 22, 1913, by ten physicians and five businessmen in New York City under the name "American Society for the Control of Cancer" (ASCC). The current name was adopted in 1944.

At the time of founding, it was not considered appropriate to mention the word "cancer" in public. Information concerning this illness was cloaked in a climate of fear and denial. Over 75,000 people died each year of cancer in just the United States. The top item on the founders' agenda was to raise awareness of cancer, before any other progress could be made in funding research. Therefore, a frenetic writing campaign was undertaken to educate doctors, nurses, patients and family members about cancer. Articles were written for popular magazines and professional journals. The ASCC undertook to publish their own journal, Campaign Notes, a monthly bulletin with information about cancer. They began recruiting doctors from all over the United States to help educate the public about cancer.

In 1936, Marjorie Illig, an ASCC field representative, suggested the creation of a network consisting of new volunteers for the purpose of waging "war on cancer". From 1935 to 1938 the number of people involved in cancer control in the US grew from 15,000 to 150,000. According to Working to Give, the Women's Field Army, a group of volunteers working for the ASCC, was primarily responsible for this increase.

The sword symbol, adopted by the American Cancer Society in 1928, was designed by George E. Durant of Brooklyn, New York. According to Durant, the two serpents forming the handle represent the scientific and medical focus of the society's mission, and the blade expresses the "crusading spirit of the cancer control movement".

In 1972, Dr. Offie Wortham, unaffiliated with ASCC and acting as a private citizen, suggested to the Philadelphia Chapter the creation of a button which said, "HELP! Your smoking is hazardous to my health."  Initially, 50,000 buttons were produced, the first evidence of a campaign against secondary smoke.  In 1973 the tobacco industry agreed not to advertise on billboards and in cinemas, and the first health warnings were displayed on cigarette packages in 1974.

In 2012 the American Cancer Society raised $934 million and spent $943 million prompting a national consolidation and cost-cutting reorganization in 2013. It centralized its operations and consolidated, merging previous regional affiliates into the parent organization. It also required all employees to reapply for their jobs.

In February 2021, Tennessee-based advertising agency Tombras Group was named the Society's agency of record. Karen E. Knudsen was named the chief executive officer in 2021. She is the first woman to lead the organization as CEO.

Activities and fund allocation

The ACS' activities include providing grants to researchers, including funding 49 Nobel Laureate researchers; discovering the link between smoking and cancer; and serving one million callers every year through its National Cancer Information Center. The Nobel Prize laureates include James D. Watson, Mario Capecchi, Oliver Smithies, Paul Berg, E. Donnall Thomas, and Walter Gilbert. The American Cancer Society's website contained a chronological listing of specific accomplishments in the fight against cancer in which the ACS had a hand, including the funding of various scientists who went on to discover life-saving cancer treatments, and advocating for increased use of preventative techniques.

The organization also runs public health advertising campaigns, and organizes projects such as the Relay For Life and the Great American Smokeout.  It operates a series of thrift stores to raise money for its operations. The ACS participates in the Hopkins 4K for Cancer, a 4000-mile bike ride from Baltimore to San Francisco to raise money for the society's Hope Lodge.

The society's allocation of funds for the fiscal year ending December 31, 2019, lists 79% of funds for Program Services (Patient Support 36%, Research 19%, Prevention 14%, Detection and Treatment 10%). The remaining 21% are allocated for supporting services (Fundraising 17%, and Management, General administration 4%). This meets the Better Business Bureau's Standards for Charity Accountability: Standard 8 (Program Service Expense Ratio) of at least 65% of total expenses spent on program activities.

In 2020, The American Cancer Society launched Gamers Vs Cancer, a series of charity online streams that feature professional gaming live streamers.

The ACS continues to sponsor many pledge-based activities such as the American Cancer Society Pennsylvania Perimeter Ride Against Cancer.

Dietary advice

The ACS recommends a healthy dietary pattern similar to the Mediterranean diet that consists mostly of plant-based foods (fruits, legumes, vegetables and whole grains) that are high in dietary fibre with fish and poultry whilst avoiding or limiting intake of red and processed meats to reduce cancer risk. The ACS also recommends people to avoid or limit sugar-sweetened beverages, highly processed foods and refined grains.

In 2020, the ACS in their "Diet and Physical Activity Guideline", stated "evidence that red and processed meats increase cancer risk has existed for decades, and many health organizations recommend limiting or avoiding these foods."

Evaluations and controversies

In 1994, The Chronicle of Philanthropy, a nonprofit industry publication, released the results of the largest study of charitable and non-profit organization popularity and credibility, conducted by Nye Lavalle & Associates.  The study showed that the American Cancer Society was ranked as the tenth "most popular charity/non-profit in America" of over 100 charities researched, with 38% of Americans over the age of 12 choosing "love" and "like a lot" for the ACS.

The Better Business Bureau lists American Cancer Society as an accredited charity meeting all of its Standards for Charity Accountability .

In 1995, the Arizona chapter of the American Cancer Society was targeted for its extremely high overhead. Two economists, James Bennett and Thomas DiLorenzo, issued a report analyzing the chapter's financial statements and demonstrating that the Arizona chapter used about 95% of its donations for paying salaries and other overhead costs, resulting in a 22 to 1 ratio of overhead to actual money spent on the cause.  The report also asserted that the Arizona chapter's annual report had grossly misrepresented the amount of money spent on patient services, inflating it by more than a factor of 10.  The American Cancer Society responded by alleging that the economists issuing the report were working for a group funded by the tobacco industry.

John R. Seffrin, former CEO of the American Cancer Society, received $2,401,112 salary and compensation from the charity for the 2009–2010 fiscal year. This is the second most money given by any charity to the head of that charity, according to Charity Watch. The money included $1.5 million in a retention benefit approved in 2001, "to preserve management stability". Seffrin's compensation for the fiscal year ending August 31, 2012, was $832,355.

The American Cancer Society was criticized in 2011 for turning down participation from the Foundation Beyond Belief in its Relay For Life "National Team" program.

The Charity Navigator gave the American Cancer Society a score of 80.88, earning it a 3-Star rating, with the finance category being scored as 73.13 and the Accountability & Transparency category being scored as 97.00.

See also

 American Cancer Society Cancer Action Network
 American Cancer Society Center
 Canadian Cancer Society
 Great American Smokeout
 Hope Lodge (American Cancer Society)
 National Cancer Institute
 National Comprehensive Cancer Network
 Programme of Action for Cancer Therapy
 Relay For Life, the signature event of the American Cancer Society

References

External links
 
 Guidestar Report on American Cancer Society, including financial data

 
1913 establishments in New York City
Charities based in Georgia (U.S. state)
Organizations established in 1913